"Sure Thing" is a song performed by Australian contemporary worship band Hillsong United. It was released on 29 October 2021, as the second single from their sixth studio album, Are We There Yet? (2022). The song was written by Benjamin Hastings, and Joel Houston. Joel Houston, Michael Guy Chislett, and Dan McMurray handled the production of the single.

"Sure Thing" peaked at No. 46 on the US Hot Christian Songs chart. "For God Is with Us" received a GMA Dove Award nomination for Short Form Video of the Year (Concept) at the 2022 GMA Dove Awards.

Background
Hillsong United released "Sure Thing" as a single on 29 October 2021, following the release of "Know You Will" in July. Jonathon Douglass of Hillsong United shared the story behind the song, saying:

Composition

Accolades

Commercial performance
"Sure Thing" debuted at number 46 on the US Hot Christian Songs chart dated 13 November 2021.

Music videos
On 9 July 2021, Hillsong United released the official music video of "Sure Thing" together with the lyric video via YouTube. The music video was filmed between Sydney and Los Angeles, with visuals contrasts transitioning from nature to concrete buildings, highlighting "faith as the only constant in a world that is ever-changing." A wanderer is lifted from the ground as the chorus builds up, suggesting that they have been transformed by the music. The music video was produced by Nathaniel Redekop and Danniebelle Whippy and directed by Ricardo Guzman.

The official live performance video of the song was released on 7 December 2021, via YouTube.

Track listing

Personnel
Credits adapted from AllMusic.

 Adam Cattell — Engineer
 Michael Guy Chislett — electric guitar, engineer, producer
 Matt Crocker — background vocals
 Garrett Davis — A&R
 Jonathan Douglass — background vocals
 Taya Gaukrodger — vocals
 Sam Gibson — mixing engineer
 Brandon Gillies — engineer, recording
 Jad Gillies — background vocals
 Benjamin Hastings — background vocals
 Hillsong United — primary artist
 Joel Houston — executive producer, keyboards, producer, programmer, vocals
 Grant Konemann — engineer, percussion
 Drew Lavyne — mastering engineer
 Dan McMurray — producer
 Daniel McMurray — drums, engineer
 Andrea Garcia Molina — A&R
 Johnny Rays — management
 Ben Tennikoff — bass, engineer, keyboards, programmer
 Matt Tennikoff — bass
 Dylan Thomas — electric guitar
 Michael Zuvela — engineer

Charts

Release history

References

External links
 

2021 songs
2021 singles
Hillsong United songs